Sun Tzu was a Chinese military general, strategist, philosopher, and writer who lived during the Eastern Zhou period of 771 to 256 BCE. Sun Tzu is traditionally credited as the author of The Art of War, an influential work of military strategy that has affected both Western and East Asian philosophy and military thinking. Sun Tzu is revered in  Chinese and East Asian culture as a legendary historical and military figure. His birth name was Sun Wu and he was known outside of his family by his courtesy name Changqing. The name Sun Tzu by which he is more popularly known is an honorific which means "Master Sun".

Sun Tzu's historicity is uncertain. The Han dynasty historian Sima Qian and other traditional Chinese historians placed him as a minister to King Helü of Wu and dated his lifetime to 544–496 BCE. Modern scholars accepting his historicity place the extant text of The Art of War in the later Warring States period of 475 to 221 BCE – based on its style of composition and its descriptions of warfare. Traditional accounts state that the general's descendant Sun Bin wrote a treatise on military tactics, also titled  The Art of War. Since both Sun Wu and Sun Bin were referred to as "Sun Tzu" in classical Chinese texts, some historians believed them identical, prior to the rediscovery of Sun Bin's treatise in 1972.

Sun Tzu's work has been praised and employed throughout the arc of East Asian military history since its composition. During the twentieth century, The Art of War grew in popularity and saw practical use in the Western world as well. It remains influential in many contemporary competitive endeavors across the modern world beyond military strategy and warfare, including espionage,
culture, politics, business, and sports.

Life

The oldest available sources disagree as to where Sun Tzu was born. The Spring and Autumn Annals and Sima Qian's later Records of the Grand Historian (Shiji) state that Sun Tzu was born in Qi. Both sources also agree that Sun Tzu was born in the late Spring and Autumn period and that he was active as a general and strategist, serving King Helü of Wu in the sixth century BCE, beginning around 512 BCE. Sun Tzu's victories then inspired him to write The Art of War. The Art of War was one of the most widely read military treatises in the subsequent Warring States period, a time of constant war among seven ancient Chinese statesZhao, Qi, Qin, Chu, Han, Wei, and Yanwho fought to control the vast expanse of fertile territory in Eastern China.

One of the better-known stories about Sun Tzu, taken from Sima Qian, illustrates Sun Tzu's temperament as follows: Before hiring Sun Tzu, the King of Wu tested Sun Tzu's skills by commanding him to train a harem of 180 concubines into soldiers. Sun Tzu divided them into two companies, appointing the two concubines most favored by the king as the company commanders. When Sun Tzu first ordered the concubines to face right, they giggled. In response, Sun Tzu said that the general, in this case himself, was responsible for ensuring that soldiers understood the commands given to them. Then, he reiterated the command, and again the concubines giggled. Sun Tzu then ordered the execution of the king's two favored concubines, to the king's protests. He explained that if the general's soldiers understood their commands but did not obey, it was the fault of the officers. Sun Tzu also said that, once a general was appointed, it was his duty to carry out his mission, even if the king protested. After both concubines were killed, new officers were chosen to replace them. Afterward, both companies, now well aware of the costs of further frivolity, performed their maneuvers flawlessly.

Sima Qian claimed that Sun Tzu later proved on the battlefield that his theories were effective (for example, at the Battle of Boju), that he had a successful military career, and that he wrote The Art of War based on his tested expertise. However, the Zuozhuan, a historical text written centuries earlier than the Shiji, provides a much more detailed account of the Battle of Boju, but does not mention Sun Tzu at all.

Historicity
Around the 12th century AD, some Chinese scholars began to doubt the historical existence of Sun Tzu, primarily on the grounds that he is not mentioned in the historical classic Zuo zhuan, which mentions most of the notable figures from the Spring and Autumn period.  The name "Sun Wu" does not appear in any text prior to the Records of the Grand Historian, and may have been a made-up descriptive cognomen meaning "the fugitive warrior"—the surname "Sun" can be glossed as the related term "fugitive" (xùn ), while "Wu" is the ancient Chinese virtue of "martial, valiant" (wǔ ), which corresponds to Sun Tzu's role as the hero's doppelgänger in the story of Wu Zixu. The only historical battle attributed to Sun Tzu, the Battle of Boju, has no record of him fighting in that battle.  

Skeptics cite possible historical inaccuracies and anachronisms in the text, and that the book was actually a compilation from different authors and military strategists. Attribution of the authorship of The Art of War varies among scholars and has included people and movements including Sun; Chu scholar Wu Zixu; an anonymous author; a school of theorists in Qi or Wu; Sun Bin; and others. Sun Bin appears to have been an actual person who was a genuine authority on military matters, and may have been the inspiration for the creation of the historical figure "Sun Tzu" through a form of euhemerism. The name Sun Wu does appear in later sources such as the Shiji and the Wu Yue Chunqiu, but were written centuries after Sun Tzu's era.

The use of the strips in other works however, such as The Methods of the Sima is considered proof of Sun Tzu's historical priority. According to Ralph Sawyer, it is very likely Sun Tzu did exist and not only served as a general but also wrote the core of the book that bears his name. It is argued that there is a disparity between the large-scale wars and sophisticated techniques detailed in the text and the more primitive small-scale battles that many believe predominated in China during the 6th century BCE. Against this, Sawyer argues that the teachings of Sun Wu were probably taught to succeeding generations in his family or a small school of disciples, which eventually included Sun Bin. These descendants or students may have revised or expanded upon certain points in the original text.

Skeptics who identify issues with the traditionalist view point to possible anachronisms in The Art of War including terms, technology (such as anachronistic crossbows), philosophical ideas, events, and military techniques that should not have been available to Sun Wu. Additionally, there are no records of professional generals during the Spring and Autumn period; these are only extant from the Warring States period, so there is doubt as to Sun Tzu's rank and generalship. This caused much confusion as to when The Art of War was actually written. The first traditional view is that it was written in 512 BCE by the historical Sun Wu, active in the last years of the Spring and Autumn period (c. 722–481 BCE). A second view, held by scholars such as Samuel Griffith, places The Art of War during the middle to late Warring States period (c. 481–221 BCE). Finally, a third school claims that the slips were published in the last half of the 5th century BCE; this is based on how its adherents interpret the bamboo slips discovered at Yinque Shan in AD 1972.

The Art of War

The Art of War is traditionally ascribed to Sun Tzu. It presents a philosophy of war for managing conflicts and winning battles. It is accepted as a masterpiece on strategy and has been frequently cited and referred to by generals and theorists since it was first published, translated, and distributed internationally.

There are numerous theories concerning when the text was completed and concerning the identity of the author or authors, but archeological recoveries show The Art of War had taken roughly its current form by at least the early Han period. Because it is impossible to prove definitively when the Art of War was completed before this date, the differing theories concerning the work's author or authors and date of completion are unlikely to be completely resolved. Some modern scholars believe that it contains not only the thoughts of its original author but also commentary and clarifications from later military theorists, such as Li Quan and Du Mu.

Of the military texts written before the unification of China and Shi Huangdi's subsequent book burning in the second century BCE, six major works have survived. During the much later Song dynasty, these six works were combined with a Tang text into a collection called the Seven Military Classics. As a central part of that compilation, The Art of War formed the foundations of orthodox military theory in early modern China. Illustrating this point, the book was required reading to pass the tests for imperial appointment to military positions.

Sun Tzu's The Art of War uses language that may be unusual in a Western text on warfare and strategy. For example, the eleventh chapter states that a leader must be "serene and inscrutable" and capable of comprehending "unfathomable plans". The text contains many similar remarks that have long confused Western readers lacking an awareness of the East Asian context. The meanings of such statements are clearer when interpreted in the context of Taoist thought and practice. Sun Tzu viewed the ideal general as an enlightened Taoist master, which has led to The Art of War being considered a prime example of Taoist strategy.

The book has also become popular among political leaders and those in business management. Despite its title, The Art of War addresses strategy in a broad fashion, touching upon public administration and planning. The text outlines theories of battle, but also advocates diplomacy and the cultivation of relationships with other nations as essential to the health of a state.

On 10 April 1972, the Yinqueshan Han Tombs were accidentally unearthed by construction workers in Shandong.
Scholars uncovered a collection of ancient texts written on unusually well-preserved bamboo slips. Among them were The Art of War and Sun Bin's Military Methods. Although Han dynasty bibliographies noted the latter publication as extant and written by a descendant of Sun, it had previously been lost. The rediscovery of Sun Bin's work is regarded as extremely important by scholars, both because of Sun Bin's relationship to Sun Tzu and because of the work's addition to the body of military thought in Chinese late antiquity.
The discovery as a whole significantly expanded the body of surviving Warring States military theory. Sun Bin's treatise is the only known military text surviving from the Warring States period discovered in the twentieth century and bears the closest similarity to The Art of War of all surviving texts.

Legacy

Sun Tzu's Art of War has influenced many notable figures. The Han dynasty historian Sima Qian recounted that China's first historical emperor, Qin's Shi Huangdi, considered the book invaluable in ending the time of the Warring States. In the 20th century, the Chinese Communist leader Mao Zedong partially credited his 1949 victory over Chiang Kai-shek and the Kuomintang to The Art of War. The work strongly influenced Mao's writings about guerrilla warfare, which further influenced communist insurgencies around the world.

Through its later influence on the Sengoku period "Great Unifiers" of Japan, Oda Nobunaga, Toyotomi Hideyoshi, and Tokugawa Ieyasu, it significantly affected the unification of Japan in the early modern era. The mastery of its teachings was honored among the samurai and its teachings were both exhorted and exemplified by influential daimyōs and shōguns. After the Meiji Restoration, it remained popular among the Imperial Japanese armed forces. The Admiral of the Fleet Tōgō Heihachirō, who led Japan's forces to victory in the Russo-Japanese War, was an avid reader of Sun Tzu.

Ho Chi Minh translated the work for his Vietnamese officers to study. His general Võ Nguyên Giáp, the strategist behind victories over the French, and wearing down American forces in Vietnam, was likewise an avid student and practitioner of Sun Tzu's ideas.

America's conflicts in East and Southeast Asia against Japan, North Korea, and North Vietnam brought Sun Tzu to the attention of American military leaders. The Department of the Army in the United States, through its Command and General Staff College, has directed all units to maintain libraries within their respective headquarters for the continuing education of personnel in the art of war. The Art of War is mentioned as an example of works to be maintained at each facility, and staff duty officers are obliged to prepare short papers for presentation to other officers on their readings. Similarly, Sun Tzu's Art of War is listed on the Marine Corps Professional Reading Program. During the Gulf War in the 1990s, both Generals Norman Schwarzkopf Jr. and Colin Powell employed principles from Sun Tzu related to deception, speed, and striking one's enemy's weak points. However, the United States and other Western countries have been criticised for not truly understanding Sun Tzu's work and not appreciating The Art of War within the wider context of Chinese society.

In the 1987 film Wall Street, the protagonist Gordon Gekko frequently cites passages from The Art of War as guiding principles for his aggressive trading techniques.

Daoist rhetoric is a component incorporated in the Art of War. According to Steven C. Combs in "Sun-zi and the Art of War: The Rhetoric of Parsimony", warfare is "used as a metaphor for rhetoric, and that both are philosophically based arts." Combs writes: "Warfare is analogous to persuasion, as a battle for hearts and minds." The application of The Art of War strategies throughout history is attributed to its philosophical rhetoric. Daoism is the central principle in the Art of War. Combs compares ancient Daoist Chinese to traditional Aristotelian rhetoric, notably for the differences in persuasion. Daoist rhetoric in The Art of War warfare strategies is described as "peaceful and passive, favoring silence over speech". This form of communication is parsimonious. Parsimonious behavior, which is highly emphasized in The Art of War as avoiding confrontation and being spiritual in nature, shapes basic principles in Daoism.

Mark McNeilly writes in Sun Tzu and the Art of Modern Warfare that a modern interpretation of Sun and his importance throughout Chinese history is critical in understanding China's push to becoming a superpower in the twenty-first century. Modern Chinese scholars explicitly rely on historical strategic lessons and The Art of War in developing their theories, seeing a direct relationship between their modern struggles and those of China in Sun Tzu's time. There is a great perceived value in Sun Tzu's teachings and other traditional Chinese writers, which are used regularly in developing the strategies of the Chinese state and its leaders.

In the 2007 video game Team Fortress 2 the soldier quotes Sun Tzu in a very misinformed manner in the meet the soldier video.

In 2008, the Chinese television producer Zhang Jizhong adapted Sun Tzu's life story into a 40-episode historical drama television series entitled Bing Sheng, starring Zhu Yawen as Sun Tzu.

The 2019 video game Age of Empires II: Definitive Edition contains challenge missions based on Sun Tzu's The Art of War, which explains the military tactics and strategies.

See also 
 Sun Bin
 The Art of War
 Confucius
 Li Shizhen

References

Citations

Sources 

 
 
 
 .
 
 .
 .
 .
 .
 .
 .

External links

Translations
 
 
 
 
 Sun Tzu and Information Warfare at the Institute for National Strategic Studies of National Defense University
 Sun Tzu's Art of War Resource Original translation, reviews of Art of War versions, interviews with translators

 
544 BC births
496 BC deaths
6th-century BC Chinese military personnel
6th-century BC Chinese writers
5th-century BC Chinese military personnel
5th-century BC Chinese writers
Ancient Chinese military writers
Chinese political philosophers
Chinese social commentators
Military strategists
Military theorists
People whose existence is disputed
Philosophers of culture
Philosophers of education
Philosophers of social science
Philosophers of war
Political philosophers
Political realists
Theoretical historians
Zhou dynasty generals
Zhou dynasty philosophers
Zhou dynasty writers